Stepanova is a rural locality (a village) and the administrative center of Stepanovskoye Rural Settlement, Kudymkarsky District, Perm Krai, Russia. The population was 542 as of 2010. There are 17 streets.

Geography 
Stepanova is located 6 km south of Kudymkar (the district's administrative centre) by road. Yurino is the nearest rural locality.

References 

Rural localities in Kudymkarsky District